Axel Hansen (13 October 1899 – 28 January 1933) was a Danish cyclist. He competed in two events at the 1920 Summer Olympics.

References

External links
 

1899 births
1933 deaths
Danish male cyclists
Olympic cyclists of Denmark
Cyclists at the 1920 Summer Olympics
Sportspeople from Amiens
Cyclists from Hauts-de-France